Jos Lammertink (born March 28, 1958 in Wierden, Overijssel) is a retired road bicycle racer from the Netherlands, who was a professional rider from 1980 to 1989. He won the Dutch title in the men's road race in 1986. That same year he was involved in a crash during stage four of the Tour de France that forced him to abandon, suffering from a fracture on his left front skull.

Teams
1980: HB Alarmsystemen (Netherlands)
1981: HB Alarmsystemen (Netherlands)
1982: B&S Wegenbouw-Elro Snacks (Netherlands)
1983: Vivi – Benotto (Italy)
1984: Panasonic (Netherlands)
1985: Panasonic (Netherlands)
1986: Panasonic (Netherlands)
1987: Transvemij-Van Schilt (Netherlands)
1988: TVM-Van Schilt (Netherlands)
1989: TVM-Ragno (Netherlands)

References

1958 births
Living people
People from Wierden
Dutch male cyclists
Dutch Vuelta a España stage winners
Cyclists from Overijssel